Ignatius Dias  is an Indian football midfielder who played for India in the 1984 Asian Cup. He also played for Salgaocar.

References
Stats at RSSSF

Year of birth missing (living people)
Living people
Indian footballers
India international footballers
Association football midfielders
Footballers from Goa